The Theatre of West Pomerania is a theatre in the German state of Mecklenburg-Vorpommern that is operated legally as a GmbH, a form of public limited company. Its shareholders are the Hanseatic towns of Stralsund and Greifswald and the town of Putbus.
The Theatre of West Pomerania puts on plays, ballets, concerts, operas, operettas and musicals.

Every year, in addition to the performances at their main sites, there are open air performances, the Baltic Sea Festivals (Ostseefestspiele) both in Stralsund (here on the old freighter, Ursula B. in Stralsund Harbour) as well as in Greifswald (on the Museum Harbour Stage, Bühne am Museumshafen, in the ruined Eldena Abbey and on the market place) and in other towns in Western Pomerania (Vorpommern).

External links 

 Theatre of West Pomerania in Greifswald and Stralsund
 Baltic Sea Festivals at the Theatre of West Pomerania

References 

Western Pomerania
Culture of Mecklenburg-Western Pomerania
Companies based in Mecklenburg-Western Pomerania